This is a list of notable software packages that implement the finite element method for solving partial differential equations.

Feature comparison

This table is contributed by a FEA-compare project, which provides an alternative view of this table with the first row and Feature column being fixed for ease of table exploration.

References

Scientific simulation software
Engineering software companies
 List of finite element software packages
Numerical analysis
Lists of software